Casirivimab/imdevimab, sold under the brand name REGEN‑COV among others, is a combination medicine used for the treatment and prevention of COVID19. It consists of two human monoclonal antibodies, casirivimab and imdevimab that must be mixed together and administered as an infusion or subcutaneous injection. The combination of two antibodies is intended to prevent mutational escape. It is also available as a co-formulated product. It was developed by the American biotechnology company Regeneron Pharmaceuticals.

The most common side effects include allergic reactions, which include infusion related reactions, injection site reactions, brief pain, weakness and others.

The combination is approved under the brand name Ronapreve for medical use in Japan, the United Kingdom, the European Union, and Australia.

In January 2022, the U.S. Food and Drug Administration (FDA) revised the authorizations for two monoclonal antibody treatments – bamlanivimab/etesevimab (administered together) and casirivimab/imdevimab – to limit their use to only when the recipients are likely to have been infected with or exposed to a variant that is susceptible to these treatments because data show these treatments are highly unlikely to be active against the omicron variant.

Medical uses 
In the European Union, the combination is indicated for the treatment of COVID19 in people aged twelve years of age and older weighing at least  who do not require supplemental oxygen and who are at high increased risk of progressing to severe COVID19; and for the prevention of COVID19 in people aged twelve years of age and older weighing at least .

Deployment 
REGEN‑COV is manufactured at the Regeneron's manufacturing facility in Rensselaer, New York. In September 2020, to free up manufacturing capacity for REGEN‑COV, Regeneron began to shift production of its existing products from Rensselaer to the Irish city of Limerick.

Regeneron has a deal in place with Roche (Genentech) to manufacture and market REGEN‑COV outside the United States.

Society and culture 
On 2 October 2020, Regeneron Pharmaceuticals announced that then-US President Donald Trump had received "a single 8 gram dose of REGN-COV2" after testing positive for SARS-CoV-2. The drug was provided by the company in response to a "compassionate use" (temporary authorization for use) request from the president's physicians.

In August 2021, Texas Governor Greg Abbott received REGEN‑COV after testing positive for COVID19.

Economics 
In January 2021, the United States agreed to purchase 1.25 million doses of the drug for $2.625 billion, at $2,100 per dose. On 14 September, another 1.4 million doses were purchased for the same price, totaling $2.94 billion.

In January 2021, the German government purchased 200,000 doses for €400 million at €2,000 per dose.

In May 2021, Roche India and Cipla announced that the medicine would be available in India for Rs 59,750 ($) per dose.

In September 2021, the World Health Organization urged producers and governments to address the drug's high cost and called for technology sharing to enable the manufacture of biosimilar versions. The WHO also said that Unitaid is negotiating with Roche for lower prices and equitable distribution, especially in low- and middle income countries.

Legal status 
In November 2021, the Committee for Medicinal Products for Human Use (CHMP) of the European Medicines Agency (EMA) recommended granting a marketing authorization in the European Union for casirivimab/imdevimab (Ronapreve) for the treatment and prevention of COVID19. The company that applied for authorization of Ronapreve is Roche Registration GmbH. Casirivimab/imdevimab was approved for medical use in the European Union in November 2021.

Research

COVID-19 
On 21 November 2020, the U.S. Food and Drug Administration (FDA) issued an emergency use authorization (EUA) for casirivimab and imdevimab to be administered together for the treatment of mild to moderate [COVID19] in people twelve years of age or older weighing at least  with positive results of direct SARS-CoV-2 viral testing and who are at high risk for progressing to severe COVID19. This includes those who are 65 years of age or older or who have certain chronic medical conditions. Casirivimab and imdevimab must be administered together by intravenous (IV) infusion or subcutaneous injection.

Casirivimab and imdevimab are not authorized for people who are hospitalized due to COVID19 or require oxygen therapy due to COVID19. A benefit of casirivimab and imdevimab treatment has not been shown in people hospitalized due to COVID19. Monoclonal antibodies, such as casirivimab and imdevimab, may be associated with worse clinical outcomes when administered to hospitalized people with COVID19 requiring high flow oxygen or mechanical ventilation. In June 2021, the EUA was revised to authorize "the use of the unapproved product, REGEN‑COV (casirivimab and imdevimab) co-formulated product and REGEN‑COV (casirivimab and imdevimab) supplied as individual vials to be administered together, for the treatment of mild to moderate COVID19 in people aged twelve years of age and older weighing at least  with positive results of direct SARS-CoV-2 viral testing, and who are at high risk for progression to severe COVID19, including hospitalization or death".

The EUA was issued to Regeneron Pharmaceuticals Inc.

On 1 February 2021, the Committee for Medicinal Products for Human Use (CHMP) of the European Medicines Agency (EMA) started a rolling review of data on the REGN‑COV2 antibody combination (casirivimab/imdevimab), which is being co-developed by Regeneron Pharmaceuticals, Inc. and F. Hoffman-La Roche, Ltd (Roche) for the treatment and prevention of COVID19. In February 2021, the CHMP concluded that the combination, also known as REGN-COV2, can be used for the treatment of confirmed COVID19 in people who do not require supplemental oxygen and who are at high risk of progressing to severe COVID19.

The Central Drugs Standards Control Organisation (CDSCO) in India, on 5 May 2021, granted an Emergency Use Authorization to Roche (Genentech) and Regeneron for use of the casirivimab/imdevimab cocktail in the country. The announcement came in light of the second wave of the COVID19 pandemic in India. Roche India maintains partnership with Cipla, thereby permitting the latter to market the drug in the country.

In July 2021, the U.S. FDA revised the emergency use authorization (EUA) for REGEN‑COV (casirivimab and imdevimab, administered together) authorizing REGEN‑COV for emergency use as post-exposure prophylaxis (prevention) for COVID19 in people aged twelve years of age and older weighing at least  who are at high risk for progression to severe COVID19, including hospitalization or death. REGEN‑COV remains authorized for the treatment of mild-to-moderate COVID19 in people aged twelve years of age and older weighing at least  with positive results of direct SARS-CoV-2 viral testing, and who are at high risk for progression to severe COVID19, including hospitalization or death.

On 12 April 2021, Roche (Genentech) and Regeneron announced that the Phase III clinical trial REGN-COV 2069 met both primary and secondary endpoints, reducing risk of infection by 81% for the non-infected participants, and reducing time-to-resolution of symptoms for symptomatic participants to one week vs. three weeks in the placebo group.

In June 2021, preliminary results form the Recovery trial showed reduced mortality from 30% to 24% in people that had produced no antibodies themselves which were 33% of the total of participants.

Trials 
In a clinical trial of people with COVID19, casirivimab and imdevimab, administered together, were shown to reduce COVID19-related hospitalization or emergency room visits in people at high risk for disease progression within 28 days after treatment when compared to placebo. The safety and effectiveness of this investigational therapy for use in the treatment of COVID19 continues to be evaluated.

The data supporting the emergency use authorization (EUA) for casirivimab and imdevimab are based on a randomized, double-blind, placebo-controlled clinical trial in 799 non-hospitalized adults with mild to moderate COVID19 symptoms. Of these participants, 266 received a single intravenous infusion of 2,400 milligrams casirivimab and imdevimab (1,200 mg of each), 267 received 8,000 mg casirivimab and imdevimab (4,000 mg of each), and 266 received a placebo, within three days of obtaining a positive SARS-CoV-2 viral test.

The prespecified primary endpoint for the trial was time-weighted average change in viral load from baseline. Viral load reduction in participants treated with casirivimab and imdevimab was larger than in participants treated with placebo at day seven. However, the most important evidence that casirivimab and imdevimab administered together may be effective came from the predefined secondary endpoint of medically attended visits related to COVID19, particularly hospitalizations and emergency room visits within 28 days after treatment. For participants at high risk for disease progression, hospitalizations and emergency room visits occurred in 3% of casirivimab and imdevimab-treated participants on average compared to 9% in placebo-treated participants. The effects on viral load, reduction in hospitalizations and ER visits were similar in participants receiving either of the two casirivimab and imdevimab doses.

As of September 2020, REGEN‑COV is being evaluated as part of the Recovery Trial, and in June 2021 the first results of the research were announced with evidence proving the effectiveness of the treatment.

References

Further reading

External links 

 
 
 
 
 
 
 

Combination antiviral drugs
COVID-19 drug development
Monoclonal antibodies
Regeneron Pharmaceuticals
Roche